The following is a list of French-language game shows that air and have aired in Canada (mainly in Quebec).

0–9

A
À la Poursuite de Carmen Sandiego (1998–2001) (French-language version of Where in Time Is Carmen Sandiego?)
Action Réaction (1986–1990) (French-language version of Chain Reaction)
Allume-moi (2013–2014) (French-langugage version of Taken Out)
Atomes Crochus (2010–2016) (French-language version of Match Game)

B
Le Banquier (2007–2017) (French-language version of Deal or No Deal)
Les Beaux Parleurs (2001–2002) (French-language version of Street Smarts)

C
Call TV (2009–2011)
Le Cercle (2005–2011)
Chacun son Métier (1954–1959) (French-language version of What's My Line?)
Charivari (1987–1991)
La classe de 5e (2009–2011) (French-language version of Are You Smarter than a 5th Grader?)
Coup de foudre (1988–1993)

D
Des Squelettes dans le Placard (2006–2019)
Les Détecteurs de mensonges (1990–2001)
Devine Combien je Gagne (2009–present) (French-language version of Win My Wage)
Distraction (2009)
Double Défi (1989–1990) (French-language version of Double Dare)

E
L'Échelle du Talent (2010–2011)
L'École des Fans (2005–2008)
L'Épicerie en folie (1994–1995) (French-language adaptation of Supermarket Sweep)

F
Face au Mur (2018) (French-language version of The Wall)
Fais-moi un Dessin (1988–1991) (French-language version of Win, Lose or Draw)
La Fureur (1998–2007)

G
Génies en herbe (1972–1997)
La Guerre des clans (1992–1997, 2009–2017, 2018–2019) (French-language version of Family Feud)

H

I
Les Indices Pensables (1999–2000)
L'Instant Gagnant (2012–2015)

J
Jeopardy! (1991–1993)

K

L
Lingo (1998–2001)

M
Mais, où se Cache Carmen Sandiego? (1995–1998) (French-language version of Where in the World Is Carmen Sandiego?)
Misez Juste (1994–1995) (original short-lived French-language version of The Price Is Right)
Le Moment de Vérité (2007–2011) (French-language version of Happy Family Plan)
Les Mordus (1997–2001)
Le Mur (2009) (French-language version of Hole in the Wall)

N

O
On connaît la chanson! (2011–2014) (French-language version of Don't Forget the Lyrics!)

P
Paquet Voleur (2007–?)
Piment Fort (1993–2001, 2016-2017)
La Poule aux oeufs d'or (1958–1966) & (1993-present)
The Price Is Right: À vous de Jouer (2011–2012) (French-language version of The Price Is Right)
Privé de Sens (2011–?)
Pyramide (2008–2011) (French-language version of Pyramid)

Q
Que le Meilleur Gagne (1993–1996, 2007) (French-language version of Everybody's Equal)
Québec à la Carte (1985–1989)

R
La Roue Chanceuse (1989–1992) (French-language version of Wheel of Fortune)

S
Silence, on joue! (2015–present) (French-language version of Hollywood Game Night)
Skatoony (2006–2010)
Synchro (2010–?)

T
Taxi Payant (2009–2018) (French-language version of Cash Cab)
Tic Tac Show (2013–2014) (French-language revival of Hollywood Squares)
Tic Tac Toc (1978–1979) (Original French-language version of Hollywood Squares)
Le tournoi de mètres (2007)
Tous Contre Un (2001–2003)
Tous Pour Un (1963–1969, 1992–1995, 2007–2011)
Le Travail à la Chaîne (1972–1981)
Le Tricheur (2012–present)

U
Ultimatum (2001–2004)
L'Union Fait la Farce (1976–1978) (original French-language version of Match Game)
L'Union Fait la Force (2003–2015)

V
Vingt-et-un (2004–2005) (French-language version of Twenty One)

W
Wipeout Québec (2009) (French-language version of Wipeout)
Wizz (2002–2003)

X

Y

Z
Les Zigotos (1994–1998)
Zizanie (1990–1992)

Reality television

See also
List of English-language Canadian game shows
List of American game shows
List of British game shows
List of Australian game shows
Game show
List of international game shows
List of television programs
UKGameshows.com (a British website devoted to reviews and descriptions of game shows)
Game Show Network (an American television channel devoted to Game shows)
GameTV (a Canadian television channel devoted to Game shows)
Challenge (a British television channel devoted to Game shows)
Nickelodeon GAS (a defunct television channel devoted to airing Nickelodeon game shows)

References

Game

French
Canadian, French-language